Dorothy Nditi or Dorothy Nditi Muchungu (born 1973) is a Kenyan politician. She is the immediate former Deputy Governor in Embu County Kenya.

Education
She holds a bachelor of arts in home economics from Kenyatta University and she is currently studying for her master's degree in nutrition and dietetics.

References

1973 births
Kenyatta University alumni
Living people
Political office-holders in Kenya
21st-century Kenyan women politicians
21st-century Kenyan politicians